Ladislaus III (Slovak and ;  12007 May 1205) was King of Hungary and Croatia between 1204 and 1205. He was the only child of King Emeric. Ladislaus was crowned king upon the orders of his ill father, who wanted to secure his infant son's succession. The dying king made his brother, Andrew, regent for the period of Ladislaus's minority. However, Duke Andrew ignored the child's interests. As a result, Ladislaus's mother, Constance of Aragon, fled to Austria, taking Ladislaus with her. Ladislaus died unexpectedly in Vienna.

Infancy (c. 1200–1204)
Ladislaus was the only known child of King Emeric and his wife, Constance of Aragon. The exact date of Ladislaus's birth is unknown, but it is likely that he was born around 1200, according to historians Gyula Kristó and Ferenc Makk. After falling seriously ill, King Emeric ordered Ladislaus's coronation in an attempt to secure a smooth succession for his infant son. John, Archbishop of Kalocsa, crowned Ladislaus on 26 August 1204. Emeric reconciled with his defiant younger brother, Andrew, whom he had imprisoned. He set Andrew free, and made him regent for the duration of Ladislaus's minority.

Reign (1204–1205)

On 30 November 1204, King Emeric died, and Ladislaus succeeded him. Pope Innocent III sent a letter to Duke Andrew, warning him to respect the child king's interests. However, refusing to heed Innocent's warning, Andrew seized the money that Emeric had deposited in the Pilis Abbey for Ladislaus. Considering her son's position to be insecure, Constance fled to Austria, taking Ladislaus with her.

Although Duke Andrew made every effort to capture Queen Constance and King Ladislaus before they could escape, they were able to reach Vienna, Austria. Duke Leopold VI, who was King Emeric's and Duke Andrew's cousin, was willing to give shelter to King Ladislaus, although Duke Andrew threatened him with an invasion. Ladislaus abruptly died on 7 May 1205. His body was carried to Székesfehérvár, and buried in the Székesfehérvár Basilica.

Ancestry

Notes

Sources

Primary sources

Archdeacon Thomas of Split: History of the Bishops of Salona and Split (Latin text by Olga Perić, edited, translated and annotated by Damir Karbić, Mirjana Matijević Sokol and James Ross Sweeney) (2006). CEU Press. .
The Hungarian Illuminated Chronicle: Chronica de Gestis Hungarorum (Edited by Dezső Dercsényi) (1970). Corvina, Taplinger Publishing. .

Secondary sources

House of Árpád
Kings of Hungary
Kings of Croatia
Monarchs who died as children
Medieval child monarchs
1200 births
1205 deaths
Burials at the Basilica of the Assumption of the Blessed Virgin Mary
13th-century Hungarian people